Santa Maria Goretti is a 20th-century parochial church and titular church in the northern suburbs of Rome, dedicated to Saint Maria Goretti.

History 

Santa Maria Goretti was built in 1953–54. It is in basilica form and built in red brick, with the arms of Pope Pius XII displayed on the facade. The floor is in dark green gritstone and green-gray Cipollino marble. Pope John XXIII visited the church in 1961.

On 18 February 2012, it was made a titular church to be held by a cardinal-deacon.

Cardinal-Protectors
Prosper Grech (2012–2019)

References

External links

Titular churches
Roman Catholic churches completed in 1954
20th-century Roman Catholic church buildings in Italy
Rome Q. XVII Trieste